In architecture, a hyphen is a connecting link between two larger building elements.  It is typically found in Palladian architecture, where the hyphens form connections between a large corps de logis and terminating pavilions.

See also
 Ell (architecture)

References

Architectural elements